The World Trade Center Asuncion (WTC Asuncion) is a building complex located in Asunción, Paraguay. It was officially opened in December 2015.

Location
Located in the heart of a new corporate center of Asuncion, consists of 4 towers of 20 floors each, with a total area of over 83,000 m2 and over 900 parking spaces.

Complex
The architectural design contributes to sustainable development of the city, achieving maximum comfort with minimum energy costs, optimizing natural resources and promoting the proper energy balance of the building to its integration with the environment and its inhabitants.

External links
http://www.worldtradecenter.com.py/ENG/wtc-asuncion.php

Asuncion